Aïn Charchar is a town and commune in Skikda Province in north-eastern Algeria.

Climate 
Aïn Cherchar's climate is classified as warm and temperate. The winter months are much rainier than the summer months. According to the Köppen Climate Classification system, this climate is classified as "Csa".

References 

Communes of Skikda Province